Reg Rogers (born December 23, 1964) is an American stage, film, and television actor, known for his roles in Primal Fear and Runaway Bride and for the TV miniseries Attila. He also appears in theater, both on Broadway and Off-Broadway.

Early life
Rogers was raised in Newport Beach, California. After high school, he attended several colleges, finally attending the Yale School of Drama, graduating in 1993.

Career
Rogers has frequently appeared in guest roles on television shows including Law & Order, CSI: Crime Scene Investigation, Friends, Boardwalk Empire, The Knick, Lipstick Jungle, Miss Match, the TV miniseries Attila, Hell on Wheels,  The Americans and The Blacklist. He played the killer Andrew Lincoln in the 2005 TV film Stone Cold, part of the Jesse Stone TV film series.

Films that featured Rogers include Primal Fear, I Shot Andy Warhol, Runaway Bride, The Photographer, Analyze That, Igby Goes Down, and Lovely by Surprise.

Theater
Rogers was nominated for the 1996 Tony Award for Best Featured Actor in a Play and the 1996 Drama Desk Award for a Broadway revival of Philip Barry's Holiday. He won the 2002 Obie Award as Outstanding Actor for his role in Richard Greenberg's Off-Broadway play The Dazzle.

In May 2005, he costarred with Marin Hinkle in the Craig Lucas adaptation of August Strindberg's Miss Julie at Rattlestick Playwrights Theater.

In 2011, he performed in two plays at Shakespeare in the Park in New York City: Measure for Measure and All's Well That Ends Well. In September 2011 he appeared in the new Theresa Rebeck play Poor Behavior at the Mark Taper Forum, Los Angeles.

In August 2013, Rogers costarred with Johanna Day in the world premiere of Carly Mensch’s play Oblivion at the Westport Country Playhouse.

In the 2014 Broadway production of You Can't Take It With You, he played Boris Kolenkhov, the Russian refugee and dance teacher.

In March 2017, he began performing as Morris Dixon in the Broadway production of Present Laughter starring Kevin Kline.

In September 2018, he originated the role of Ron Carlisle in Tootsie. Moved to Broadway in March 2019.

Filmography

Film

Television

Video games

References

External links
 
 
 
  Reg Rogers profile at Manhattan Theatre Club

1964 births
Living people
American male film actors
American male stage actors
Male actors from Newport Beach, California
Place of birth missing (living people)
20th-century American male actors
21st-century American male actors
Yale School of Drama alumni